The 1936 TCU Horned Frogs football team represented Texas Christian University (TCU) in the 1936 college football season. The team was coached by Dutch Meyer in his third year as coach, finishing the season 9–2–2 (4–1–1 SWC). Led by senior quarterback Sammy Baugh, the offense scored 160 points, while the defense allowed 58 points. The Frogs defeated Marquette in the inaugural Cotton Bowl Classic, played  in Dallas.

The final AP poll was released in late November and TCU was sixteenth; they then defeated #6 Santa Clara on December 12, and #20 Marquette on New Year's Day.  Baugh was a first round selection in the 1937 NFL Draft, taken sixth overall by the Boston Redskins, who moved south to Washington, D.C. prior to the  season.

Schedule

Team players drafted into the NFL

Awards and honors
 Sammy Baugh, All-American selection
 Sammy Baugh, Cotton Bowl Classic Most Valuable Player
 Sammy Baugh, fourth in voting for the Heisman Trophy in 1936.

References

TCU
TCU Horned Frogs football seasons
Cotton Bowl Classic champion seasons
TCU Horned Frogs football